The Inskoye mine is a large iron mine located in eastern Russia in the Sakha Republic. Inskoye represents one of the largest iron ore reserves in Russia and in the world having estimated reserves of 250 million tonnes of ore grading 45.2% iron metal.

See also 
 List of mines in Russia

References 

Iron mines in Russia